Maiwut is a county in Upper Nile State, South Sudan.

In a recent Southern Sudan referendum, Maiwut County made a historic milestone with all of its registered population voting 100% for Separation of the southern Sudan.

References

Upper Nile (state)
Counties of South Sudan